The 1st Golden Raspberry Awards were held on March 31, 1981, at John Wilson's living room alcove to recognize the worst the film industry had to offer in 1980. Each category included as many as ten nominees; the maximum was lowered to five the following year to mirror the Oscars.

Winners and nominees

Films with multiple nominations 
These films received multiple nominations:

Criticism 
The awards are often criticized for nominating The Shining in two categories: for Shelley Duvall in Worst Supporting Actress, and Stanley Kubrick in Worst Director. In 2022, the awards committee rescinded Duvall's nomination. The nominations for Brian De Palma's Dressed to Kill have also been criticized.

See also

 1980 in film
 53rd Academy Awards
 34th British Academy Film Awards
 38th Golden Globe Awards

Notes

References

External links
 Official summary of awards
 Nomination and award listing  at the Internet Movie Database

Golden Raspberry Awards
01
Golden Raspberry Awards
Golden Raspberry Awards
Golden Raspberry